Mr. Untouchable is an English-language documentary film for HDNet Films, directed by Marc Levin, and produced by Mary-Jane Robinson. The film, which opened in limited release on October 26, 2007, like the memoir, Mr. Untouchable: My Crimes and Punishments (released in February 2007), addresses the rise and fall of Nicky Barnes, a former drug kingpin in New York City. The film includes first-hand testimony from Barnes himself and was produced by New York-based Blowback Productions.

Cast
Nicky Barnes, The Godfather of Harlem
Thelma Grant, the former Mrs. Nicky Barnes
Frank James, an original member of the 'Council'
Joseph 'Jazz' Hayden, an original member of the 'Council'
Jackie Hayden, Jazz's wife
Leon 'Scrap' Batts, a Lieutenant in Barnes organization
Carol Hawkins, heroin street dealer for Barnes organization
David Breitbart, Nicky's lawyer
Don Ferrarone, DEA Agent in charge of Nicky Barnes case
Louie Diaz, undercover DEA agent
Bobby Nieves, a DEA agent
Robert Geronimo, a DEA informant
Robert Fiske, Jr., US Attorney for Southern District of NY who prosecuted Barnes
Tom Sear, Ass. US Attorney
Benito Romano, Assistant US Attorney who flipped Barnes
Fred Ferretti, reporter who wrote 1977 NY Times article, "Mr. Untouchable"

References
Roberts, Sam, "Crime's 'Mr. Untouchable' Emerges From Shadows", The New York Times, March 4, 2007.

External links
 
 

HDNet Films Site
Magnolia Pictures Site

Documentary films about organized crime in the United States
2007 films
Films directed by Marc Levin
Documentary films about the illegal drug trade
Films about African-American organized crime
Magnolia Pictures films
2000s English-language films
2000s American films